These are the complete list of songs by the South Korean boy group BtoB.

0-9

A

B

C

D

E

F

G

H

I

J

K

L

M

N

O

P

R

S

T

U

W

Y

Other songs

See also
 Seo Eunkwang discography
 Lee Min-hyuk discography
 Lee Chang-sub discography
 Im Hyun-sik discography
 Peniel Shin discography
 Jung Il-hoon discography
 Yook Sung-jae discography

Notes

References

Songs
BtoB